Boriss Bogdaškins (born 21 February 1990) is a Latvian footballer who plays as a midfielder.

Career
Bogdaškins made his international debut for Latvia on 6 September 2019 in a UEFA Euro 2020 qualifying match against Austria, which finished as a 0–6 away loss.

Career statistics

International

References

External links
 
 
 

1990 births
Living people
Footballers from Riga
Latvian footballers
Latvia under-21 international footballers
Latvia international footballers
Association football midfielders
SK Blāzma players
FK Jelgava players
Riga FC players
Valmieras FK players
FK Ventspils players
Latvian Higher League players